North–South Freeway can refer to any of the following roads:
North–South Freeway (New Jersey)
North–South Freeway (Wisconsin), an alternate name for Interstate 43 in the Milwaukee area